Murder in the Hamptons (also known as Million Dollar Murder) is a true story made-for-TV movie, based on the events leading to the murder of multi-millionaire Ted Ammon and the conviction of Ted's estranged wife's lover Daniel Pelosi.

Plot
The movie is told through various points of view in a semi-documentary. Generosa (Poppy Montgomery) is a struggling artist who sells real estate, and one day, when client Ted (David Sutcliffe) fails to show up, she goes over to confront him. They soon fall in love, get married and are happy for several years during which time they adopt twin orphans: Alexa Ammon (Aislinn Paul) and Greg Ammon (Munro Chambers).  Whether a result of being a mother or from an organic or drug-induced biochemical imbalance, Generosa becomes increasingly paranoid accusing Ted of, among other indiscretions, adultery.  Her erratic behavior tears the marriage apart, thereby unleashing a very contentious divorce procedure with Generosa demanding custody of the twins, ownership of their house in the Hamptons and, if possible, all of Ted's wealth. She even resorts to lying to the children about Ted in an attempt to turn them against him.

Unable to come to an agreement, Generosa and the twins stay at a hotel where she meets her contractor Daniel "Danny" Pelosi (Shawn Christian), and the two start a relationship, with him pushing her to hold out for money from Ted. When Ted is murdered, she inherits all of Ted's estate; three months thereafter, she and Danny get married. She holds back the truth about Ted's death from her children by telling them that Ted committed suicide by drinking alcohol, along with swallowing pills. They eventually come under police suspicion. Generosa learns that she's dying from breast cancer.

Danny wants custody of the kids, but Generosa rejects the idea because he'd been partying and spending her money carelessly. She changes her will, leaving Danny with only $2,000,000, $1,000,000 to her housekeeper and nanny, Kaye, and the remainder of her wealth to her children. Kaye also receives custody of the children and soon, she sends Greg away to a private school, while his sister remains behind. Some time after Generosa's death, Danny is arrested for Ted's murder. In 2004, Danny is found guilty and he is sentenced to 25 years to life.

Cast
 Poppy Montgomery as Generosa Ammon, the villain. After Ted's murder, she becomes a widow. Afterwards, Generosa dies from breast cancer.
 David Sutcliffe as Ted Ammon, the victim and the hero. He is killed by Danny.
 Shawn Christian as Daniel Pelosi, the primary villain of the movie. He is the one responsible for Ted's death and is arrested at the end.
 Aislinn Paul as Alexa Ammon
 Munro Chambers as Greg Ammon
 Peter Outerbridge as Gordon Wintrob
 Donna Goodhand as Aunt Carrie, Generosa and Ted's sister and the kids' aunt.
 Helene Joy as Grace
 Gabriel Hogan as Matt
 Tara Rosling as Carrie Wilder
 Michael A. Miranda as Artie Rubino
 Joris Jarsky as Carl Masella
 Alex Poch-Goldin as Ed Burke
 Nadia Capone as Oncologist
 Kate Trotter as Neighbor
 Brigitte Robinson as Charlotte
 Tracey Ferencz as Denise
 Landy Cannon as Tennis Pro
 Aliska Malish as Beach Girl
 Kasia Vassos as Beach Girl
 Maxim Roy as Lindy Fisher
 Lindsey Connell as Secretary
 Allasen Miscion as Alexa Ammon, 4 years old
 Mitchell Nye as Greg Ammon, 4 years old
 Vito Rezza as Cab Driver
 Sarain Boylan as Tammy
 Roman Podhora as Bartender
 James Allodi as Architect
 Alex Karzis as Landscaper
 Pedro Salvín as Concierge
 Johnie Chase as Museum official
 Trent McMullen as Private Investigator
 Marcia Bennett as Psychiatrist
 Diego Klattenhoff as Traffic Cop
 Rory O'Shea as Mark Dell
 Brendan Connor as Kevin Drysdale
 J.C. Kenny as Amanda Zahn

References

External links
 
 
 
 

Lifetime (TV network) films
Canadian television films
Canadian films based on actual events
English-language Canadian films
2005 television films
2005 films
2000s Canadian films